The Metro Cammell EMU (also known as M-Train or Modernisation Train) is the oldest variation of electric multiple unit that operates on the MTR rapid transit railway system in Hong Kong. A total of 768 cars were built by Metro-Cammell in England (and its successor GEC-Alsthom) between 1977 and 1994, and refurbished from 1998 to 2001 by United Goninan.

Features

Urban line stock

The M-Train, along with the later C-Train, TML C-train, R-train and ex-KCR stock, has five sets of double-leaf sliding doors on both sides of each car, to facilitate rapid boarding and exiting. This is opposed to the K-Train and AdTranz-CAF trains, which use plug doors. They are currently operating primarily on the Tsuen Wan line and Island line but are also operating on the Kwun Tong line and Tseung Kwan O line alongside newer rolling stock.

Trains are also fitted for driverless operation with a single train operator in each train opening and closing doors and monitoring the route. Primary suspension is chevron springs, while the secondary suspension is air bags. Traction system is mostly through GTO chopper control. Each carriage has 45 seats and capable of holding 268 standing passengers, with space for wheelchairs, giving a total capacity of just over 2500 passengers, or approximately 3000 passengers under crush load. At the time of its introduction in 1979, the MTR M-Train EMU was believed to have the highest capacity of any metro car in the world.

Although another set of EMU trains from the same manufacturer operated on the East Rail line, there are some significant differences between the two models. The Metro Cammell EMUs of the East Rail line, which are also known as the Mid-Life Refurbishment Train, were formerly operated by the Kowloon–Canton Railway until being taken over by the MTR in 2007. However, the KCRC retained ownership of the MLR Trains. All 29 Mid-Life Refurbishment trains were fully retired by May 2022 and all 93 M-Trains will be expected to be fully retired by 2027.

Disneyland Resort line stock

When the Disneyland Resort line opened in 2005, some second-hand M-Train units originally built in the early-1990s were refurbished and assigned to the line. The MTR designed a new driverless train and produced it by refitting existing M-Trains for the line which is designed with a Disney theme in mind. Statues of well-known Disney characters are included inside of the trains, such as Mickey Mouse and Donald Duck.
Units A/C274, A/C281, A/C284, A/C289, A/C291 and B/C490 of M-Train have been assigned to the Disneyland Resort line and completely refurbished into new trains.

There are major differences on the Disneyland Resort line trains compared to the main line trains.
 For B/C490, a cab has been added to the B car.
 The train cars have only 3 doors per side, for a total of 6 doors per car.
 The trains use electric doors instead of air-powered doors.

However, the operator's cab area has been retained, visible through the glass window at the train ends. Primary suspension is chevron springs, while the secondary suspension is air bags. Traction system is through GTO chopper control.

Variants

M-Train is divided into 6 types of stock. They are the:
 CM-Stock - Modified Modified Initial System Stock (A/C101-170, B/C401-435)
 CT-Stock - Modified Tsuen Wan line stock (A/C171-247, B/C436-458, 460-479)
 I-Stock - Island line stock (A/C248-256, B/C459)
 G-Stock - Trains for Eastern Harbour Tunnel extension (A/C257-269, B/C480-485)
 H-Stock - Trains for the signalling upgrade  (A/C270-291, B/C486-496)
 Q-Stock - All D Cars (See Below) (D601-788)

Refurbishment

The whole fleet was refurbished within a period of six years between 1996-2001. These included the redesigning of the train’s front which originally featured a red stripe and a white head. The refurbished front has a silver and black coating with new electronic destination and train running number displays. The interior changes include the replacement of lighting and seats, along with installation of new dot-matrix display showing news and weather information, and flashing system maps indicating the station and line that the train is running on. The old black ball-shaped strap hangers were replaced with new red handles. The grab poles are now marked with red in the middle. Some other changes included altering the fibreglass facade on the exterior ends to modernise their appearance, as well as the installation of the advanced digital voice announcement (DVA) and passenger information systems. United Goninan was subsequently awarded a contract to maintain the MTR rolling stock. Some of these new features were not integrated into the M-Trains until late 2001.

Another refurbishment was planned (contract C1066-13E) to update the trains' interior and exterior features to make them feel more modern; however the refurbishment will not take place as plans now call for the M-trains to be replaced by new trains (train set A247/A232 had its handles and grab poles replaced with yellow double-branching poles, although some red poles were retained).

Tractions and configurations
The traction system of M-Stock and T-Stock trains were changed to Chopper from Camshaft in 1992–1995, which gives them the present name CM-Stock and CT-Stock. This was done to keep operating and maintenance cost-effective and to improve performance. All I-Stock trains belong to Island line (excluding A126/A255 which transferred to TWL as an I-Stock (of which 3 cars were scrapped as they were damaged beyond repair in 2019, while the other 5 carriages were transferred to Siu Ho Wan Depot and some were subsequently scrapped in 2022.))

The configuration of a 8-car M-train in revenue service is (Up track direction) A-C+D+C-B+D+C-A. There was once a type of train with all motor cars A-C+C-B+C-B+C-A (also known as "solid train") but this formation does not exist anymore, although it is possible to configure an M-Train into a solid train. Units A/C274, A/C281, A/C284, A/C289, A/C291 and B/C490 have been assigned to the Disneyland Resort line and completely refurbished into new trains (see below). Additionally, 6-car and 4-car formations existed during the earlier years of the MTR: (Up track direction) A-C+C-B+C-A (6 cars) or A-C+C-A (4 cars).

Phases

Phase 1
The MTRC placed its first train order with Metro-Cammell in July 1976, initially ordering 140 railway carriages. The M-Stock trains (now CM-Stock trains) were the first batch of trains ordered by MTR. They were delivered from 1979 to 1982, and had their traction systems changed to GTO Chopper from Cam Shaft in 1992–1995. They now serve on the Kwun Tong line.

Phase 2A
The T-Stock trains (now CT-Stock trains) were the second batch of trains ordered by MTR. They were delivered from 1982 to 1985 and also had their traction systems changed to GTO Chopper in 1992–1995. They now serve on the Tsuen Wan line.

A/C182's traction systems was changed from Cam Shaft to RCT Chopper in 1983, then in 1987 it was changed again to GTO Chopper.

Phase 2B
The I-Stock trains, the third batch of trains, were ordered by MTRC for the planned Island line in 1981. They were delivered from 1985 to 1986 and serve on the Island line excluding set A255/A126.

B/C459 used Cam Shaft till 1987. However, all the other trains used RCT Chopper, while B/C459's parts were from A/C182.

Phase 2C
The G-Stock trains were built for the Eastern Harbour Crossing extension of the Kwun Tong line (became part of the Tseung Kwan O line in 2002), they were delivered from 1988 to 1989 and still serve on the Kwun Tong line. However, they moved to Tsuen Wan line starting from December 2017. They were the last batch of MTR M-Trains to be made by Metro-Cammell before being acquired by GEC-Alsthom in 1989.

Phase 3
The MTRC signed a contract in March 1992 for 64 new rail cars (48 motorcars, 16 trailers) with an option for an additional 24 carriages. These were delivered by GEC Alsthom as components, with final assembly carried out at the Kowloon Bay Depot. The H-Stock trains were delivered from 1994 to 1998 and some units were refurbished to serve on the Disneyland Resort line (the remaining units served on the Tseung Kwan O line from 2002 to 2010, and Kwun Tong line from April 2010 onwards. However, they moved to Tsuen Wan line starting from December 2017). 88 cars were assembled locally at Kowloon Bay depot.

Q-Stock
The first batch of Q-stock D-car (trailers) were ordered as part of Phase 2A trains from 1984 to 1985, cars D601-706 and D707-724; the second batch (Phase 2B, cars D725-752) were ordered from 1985 to 1986; the third batch (Phase 2C, cars D753-763) were ordered from 1988 to 1989, and the fourth and final batch (cars D764-788) were ordered from 1994 to 1998 as part of Phase 3.

Surplus / retired cars
The surplus cars are B/C493, B/C445, A/C112 and A/C126, D736, D737 and D784. Some useful parts on these trains have been cannibalised for other carriages, so they may no longer be used. Some of these cars were scrapped in August 2022.

The retired / written off cars are A/C131, A/C255 B/C451, B/C459 and D652. B/C459 was taken out of service in 2008 due to motor part issues from A/C254 and lack of Phase 2B parts, so a backup unit B/C404 took over B/C459 on A/C227 - A/C170 (now A/C227 with A/C214 on the Tsuen Wan line). Additionally, D652 and B/C451 were severely damaged in 2019 during CBTC testing between Admiralty Station and Central Station. 

A255/A126 was taken out of service due to A255/C255 being damaged due to the October 6th Lai King crash. The train was towed to Tsuen Wan Depot and was emptied of passengers on the way, but A255/C255’s bogies were too faulty. Therefore, MTR had A255/C255 scrapped in Tsuen Wan Depot. 

The original surplus cars used to be A/C115, A/C145, A/C273, B/C404 and D784.

Train configurations

Replacement
All 93 sets will be retired from service around 2022–2027. MTR had originally planned to replace 78 sets. However, in July 2015, MTR announced that CRRC Qingdao Sifang had won an order to build 93 sets that is set to replace all M-Trains by 2027, on grounds that it was "better value for money". In addition, the current Westinghouse signalling system will be phased out in favour of a communications-based train control (CBTC) system, similar to that of the West Rail line and South Island line. In the meantime, 36 of the M-Trains have been equipped with CBTC equipment, all of which is in the Tsuen Wan Line, supplied by Thales, for use on the Tsuen Wan line as an interim measure while their replacement trains are being delivered. 

However, the Disneyland Resort Line trains will not be changed. This means A/C274, A/C281, A/C284, A/C289, A/C291 and B/C490 will continue their service on the Disneyland Resort Line as P/Q501-506 with GoA 4 (automated trains).

The first sets to be withdrawn are A255/A126 and A131/A112, which were involved in incidents in 2019. Full withdrawal began with the first full 8-car set,  A167/A168 (A167-C167+D710+B431-C431+D786+C168-A168), retired from regular service at the night of 10 September 2022, and was brought to Siu Ho Wan Depot for cutting and transporting away to scrapyards in Tuen Mun. The Electrical and Mechanical Services Department requested that the MTR scrap 6 M-Trains before 2023.

Planned export to Singapore 
In the early-1980s, Metro Cammell and GEC Traction proposed a version of the MTR M-Train EMU for Singapore's Mass Rapid Transit (MRT) metro system (which eventually opened in 1987), alongside several other bidders from France, Canada, West Germany, Sweden and Japan. Although Metro Cammell was shortlisted along with the Swedish ASEA and the Japanese Kawasaki Heavy Industries-led consortium, its eventual loss to the aforementioned Kawasaki consortium in winning what later became Contract 151 for Singapore's first metro rolling stock type was reported to be the relative energy inefficiency of the GEC Traction camshaft traction system then used by all MTR M-Trains. Another factor was a measuring error involving the London Underground 1983 Stock during the evaluation phase for Contract 151. The loss of said contract was a massive financial blow to Metro Cammell, who was forced to  reduce their workforce by half in August 1984, and was eventually acquired by GEC-Alsthom in 1989.

See also 
 List of driverless trains

References

External links

 1970s Metro-Cammell Products - Metcam.co.uk (dedicative site)

MTR rolling stock
Metropolitan Cammell multiple units
Train-related introductions by year
Electric multiple units of Hong Kong
Electric multiple units of Great Britain
1500 V DC multiple units
Alstom multiple units